"We Didn't Start the Fire" is the fifteenth episode of the fifteenth season of the American medical drama television series Grey's Anatomy, and the 332nd overall episode, which aired on ABC on February 28, 2019. The episode was written by Andy Reaser and directed by the starring cast member Chandra Wilson. The episode officially made Grey’s Anatomy the longest running American primetime medical drama series, surpassing ER.

Plot
In this record-breaking episode, the doctors of Grey Sloan throw a party at Jackson's house to celebrate Amelia and Koracick's successful surgery on Catherine. Alex and Jo worry something might be wrong when Alex's mom, Helen, visits unexpectedly. Amelia and Owen say a final goodbye to Betty and Leo, putting them in a bad mood for the party. Meredith tells Alex that she is dating Andrew and is later caught making out with Andrew in Jackson's guest room by Richard, exposing their relationship further. Maggie is annoyed by an article about her surgery on Kimberly Thompson, while Jackson grows impatient when Catherine, who goes out drinking with Bailey, fails to show up to the party. Owen spends the evening sulking about Teddy and Koracick's relationship, causing Amelia to break up with him, as she is tired of the constant back-and-forth. Right after Koracick punches Owen for an insensitive comment, everyone is rushed out of the house when the fire alarm goes off. After the party, Betty's parents return Leo to Owen and Amelia, as they believe they are better fit to raise him, and Carina interrupts Andrew and Meredith at his apartment with the arrival of Andrew and Carina's estranged father.

Production
This episode was written by Andy Reaser and directed by Chandra Wilson. In this episode, Grey's Anatomy becomes the longest-running American primetime medical drama series, after the series finale of ER on April 2, 2009.

Reception
"We Didn't Start the Fire" was originally broadcast on February 28, 2019, in the United States on the American Broadcasting Company (ABC). The episode was watched by a total of 6.99 million viewers, rising up from the previous episode's 6.89. In the key 18-49 demographic, the episode scored a 1.6/8 rating/share, down one tenth from the previous episode. The episode ranked 7th in the Top 25 primetime broadcast shows of the week in adults 18-49 rating, 16th in terms of viewership, and became the most viewed drama series of the week.

References

External links
 

Grey's Anatomy (season 15) episodes
2019 American television episodes